Fear Index - common name for the Chicago Board Options Exchange Market Volatility Index, ticker symbol VIX, measuring the implied volatility of S&P 500 index options
The Fear Index - a 2011 novel by British author Robert Harris